Rohrmann is a German surname. Notable people with the surname include:

Heike Rohrmann (born 1969), East German female shot putter
Petra Rohrmann (born 1962), East German cross-country skier

See also
Jeff Rohrman, American soccer player and coach

German-language surnames